Lewis Ashurst Majendie (1835 – 22 October 1885) was a British Conservative Party politician.

Parliamentary career
At the 1874 general election, Majendie was elected as one of the two Members of Parliament (MPs) for the parliamentary borough of Canterbury in Kent. He held the seat until his resignation in 1879, by the procedural device of accepting the post of Steward of the Chiltern Hundreds.

Personal life 
On 8 January 1870, Majendie married Lady Margaret Elizabeth Lindsay, the daughter of Alexander Lindsay, 25th Earl of Crawford and Margaret Lindsay. They lived at Hedingham Castle in Essex.

References

External links 
 

1835 births
1885 deaths
Conservative Party (UK) MPs for English constituencies
UK MPs 1874–1880
Politics of Canterbury